Andrea Pisano (Pontedera 12901348 Orvieto) also known as Andrea da Pontedera, was an Italian sculptor and architect.

Biography
Pisano first learned the trade of a goldsmith. Pisano then became a pupil of Mino di Giovanni, about 1300, and worked with him on the sculpture for S. Maria della Spina at Pisa and elsewhere. He made his chief works in Florence, and the formation of his mature style was due rather to Giotto di Bondone than to his earlier master. Of the three world-famed bronze doors of the Baptistery in Florence, the earliest one on the south side was Pisano's work; he started it in 1330 and finished it in 1336. It consists of a number of small quatrefoil panels, the lower eight containing single figures of the Virtues, and the rest scenes from the life of John the Baptist.

Andrea Pisano, while living in Florence, also produced many important works of marble sculpture, all of which strongly show Giotto's influence. In 1340 he succeeded Giotto as Master of the Works of Florence Cathedral. There he produced a series of reliefs, possibly designed by his former teacher, including the double band of panel-reliefs which Pisano executed for the great campanile. The subjects of these are the Four Great Prophets, the Seven Virtues, the Seven Sacraments, the Seven Works of Mercy and the Seven Planets. The duomo contains the chief of Pisano's other Florentine works in marble. In 1347 he became Master of the Works at Orvieto Cathedral, which had already been designed and begun by Lorenzo Maitani. These and the aforementioned doors are Pisano's only known works. Pisano also contributed to freeing modern art from Byzantine influence. He died in 1348.

Andrea Pisano had two sons, Nino and Tommaso. Both sons eventually succeeded him as Master of the Works at Orvieto Cathedral.

Giorgio Vasari includes a biography of Andrea Pisano in his Lives.

Pisano's chief pupil was Andrea di Cione, better known as Andrea Orcagna. Another pupil, Giovanni di Balduccio, executed the shrine of Sant'Eustorgio in Milan.

Gallery

References

External links
 Panels by Andrea Pisano in Santa Maria del Fiore, Florence, Italy
 The bronze door of the Baptistery in Florence and other work by Andrea Pisano

1290 births
1340s deaths
People from the Province of Pisa
Italian sculptors
Italian male sculptors
14th-century Italian architects
Gothic sculptors